Marchigüe, sometimes spelled Marchihue, is a Chilean town and commune in the Cardenal Caro Province of Chile's sixth region of O'Higgins.

Demographics
Of these, 2,208 (32%) lived in urban areas and 4,696 (68%) in rural areas. The population grew by 11.2% (695 persons) between the 1992 and 2002 censuses.

Administration

As a commune, Marchigüe is a third-level administrative division of Chile administered by a municipal council, headed by an alcalde who is directly elected every four years. The 2021-2024 alcalde is Héctor Cristian Salinas Herrera.

References

External links
  Municipality of Marchigüe

Communes of Chile
Populated places in Cardenal Caro Province